Lake Kokanee, also known as Lower Lake Cushman, is a 150-acre (607,000 m²) reservoir on the North Fork of the Skokomish River in Mason County, Washington. The lake is maintained by Cushman Dam No. 2, providing electrical power to the Tacoma Power system.

See also
Kokanee (disambiguation)

References

External links
Lake Levels and River Flows, Cushman Project Settlement, Tacoma Power

Bodies of water of Mason County, Washington
Kokanee
Protected areas of Mason County, Washington
Tacoma Public Utilities